Tatiana Dokoudovska (13 January 1921 – 21 September 2005) was a French ballet dancer, choreographer and ballet master of Russian origin.

Biography
Tatiana Dokoudovska was born on 13 January 1921 in Beausoleil, France, near Monte Carlo, from Alexis and Nadia Dokoudovsky. His father was the son of a Russian nobleman and the Italian grandfather of her mother Nadia, an opera singer.

A student of Olga Preobrajenska, prima ballerina of the Russian Imperial Theatre, Dokoudovska at the age of 12 started her professional career, dancing in operettas and films. While attending the Ecole des Artes (Professional School), she danced for the lyric season in Monte Carlo, then was hired as a soloist by the Ballet Russe de l'Opera Comique in Paris.

In 1939 she traveled to the United States and joined the Mordkin Ballet, with which she toured and spent a season in New York City, continuing with the company that would later be called the American Ballet Theatre.

She died on 21 September 2005. She was buried at Forest Hill Calvary Cemetery in Kansas City.

See also

List of Russian ballet dancers

References

Sources

Bibliography

French female dancers
French ballet masters
People from Beausoleil, Alpes-Maritimes
1921 births
2005 deaths
Russian people of French descent
20th-century French ballet dancers
Russian female dancers
20th-century Russian ballet dancers
20th-century French women
20th-century Russian women